Baron Fock (Swedish: Friherre Fock), is a title in the Peerage of Sweden. It was created in 1815 for Bernt Wilhelm Fock, a member of the Fock family.

References 

Fock